There are six stadiums in use by Northwest League baseball teams. The oldest stadium is Funko Field (1947) in Everett, Washington, home of the Everett AquaSox. The newest stadium is Ron Tonkin Field (2013) in Hillsboro, Oregon, home of the Hillsboro Hops. One stadium was built in the 1940s, two in the 1950s, and one in each of the 1990s, 2000s, and 2010s. The highest seating capacity is 6,803 at Avista Stadium in Spokane, Washington, where the Spokane Indians play. The lowest capacity is 3,654 at Gesa Stadium in Pasco, Washington, where the Tri-City Dust Devils play.

Stadiums and Map

Gallery

See also

List of High-A baseball stadiums
List of Midwest League stadiums
List of South Atlantic League stadiums

References

General reference

External links

Northwest League
Northwest League stadiums